Neelam Sivia (born 1989) is an Indian television and film actress.

Early life and Career 
She has worked in a Punjabi film 47 to 84.

She has also worked in many television shows like Kya Huaa Tera Vaada, MTV Webbed, Gumrah: End of Innocence, Love by Chance, Yeh Hai Aashiqui, Pyaar Tune Kya Kiya, Halla Bol, Saubhagyalakshmi, Nadaniyaan and Naamkarann.

She finished working in 4 Lions Films' web series Tanhaiyan as Tanya and TV series called Naamkarann on Star Plus.

Currently, she is seen in the webseries called Aafat.

Personal life 
Sivia married musician and drummer Apoorv Singh.

Filmography

Film

Television

References

External links

Indian women television presenters
Indian television presenters
Living people
People from Jalandhar
Actresses in Punjabi cinema
Indian film actresses
Indian television actresses
Indian soap opera actresses
1988 births